Charles Samuel Williams (22 January 1881 – 14 November 1969) was an Australian rules footballer who played with Richmond in the Victorian Football League (VFL).

Notes

External links 

1881 births
1969 deaths
Australian rules footballers from Melbourne
Richmond Football Club players
Richmond Football Club (VFA) players
People from Richmond, Victoria